The 2016–17 UEFA Europa League group stage began on 15 September and ended on 9 December 2016. A total of 48 teams compete in the group stage to decide 24 of the 32 places in the knockout phase of the 2016–17 UEFA Europa League.

Draw
The draw was held on 26 August 2016, 13:00 CEST, at the Grimaldi Forum in Monaco. The 48 teams were drawn into twelve groups of four, with the restriction that teams from the same association could not be drawn against each other. For the draw, the teams were seeded into four pots based on their 2016 UEFA club coefficients.

Moreover, the draw was controlled for teams from the same association in order to split the teams evenly into the two sets of groups (A–F, G–L) for maximum television coverage.

The fixtures were decided after the draw. On each matchday, six groups play their matches at 19:00 CEST/CET, while the other six groups play their matches at 21:05 CEST/CET, with the two sets of groups (A–F, G–L) alternating between each matchday. There are other restrictions: for example, teams from the same city in general do not play at home on the same matchday (UEFA tries to avoid teams from the same city playing at home on the same day, due to logistics and crowd control), and teams in certain countries (e.g. Russia) do not play at home on the last matchday (due to cold weather and simultaneous kick-off times).

On 17 July 2014, the UEFA emergency panel ruled that Ukrainian and Russian clubs would not be drawn against each other "until further notice" due to the political unrest between the countries. Therefore, Ukrainian clubs Shakhtar Donetsk (Pot 1) and Zorya Luhansk (Pot 4) and Russian clubs Zenit Saint Petersburg (Pot 1) and Krasnodar (Pot 3) could not be drawn into the same group.

Teams
Below are the participating teams (with their 2016 UEFA club coefficients), grouped by their seeding pot. They include 16 teams which enter in this stage, the 22 winners of the play-off round, and the 10 losers of the Champions League play-off round.

Notes

Format
In each group, teams play against each other home-and-away in a round-robin format. The group winners and runners-up advance to the round of 32, where they are joined by the eight third-placed teams from the Champions League group stage.

Tiebreakers
The teams are ranked according to points (3 points for a win, 1 point for a draw, 0 points for a loss). If two or more teams are equal on points on completion of the group matches, the following criteria are applied in the order given to determine the rankings (regulations Article 16.01):
higher number of points obtained in the group matches played among the teams in question;
superior goal difference from the group matches played among the teams in question;
higher number of goals scored in the group matches played among the teams in question;
higher number of goals scored away from home in the group matches played among the teams in question;
if, after having applied criteria 1 to 4 (to a set of three or more teams), a subset of those teams still have an equal ranking, criteria 1 to 4 are reapplied exclusively to the matches between the tied teams in question to determine their final rankings. If this procedure does not lead to a decision, criteria 6 to 12 apply;
superior goal difference in all group matches;
higher number of goals scored in all group matches;
higher number of away goals scored in all group matches;
higher number of wins in all group matches;
higher number of away wins in all group matches;
lower disciplinary points total based only on yellow and red cards received in all group matches (red card = 3 points, yellow card = 1 point, expulsion for two yellow cards in one match = 3 points);
higher club coefficient.

Groups
The matchdays are 15 September, 29 September, 20 October, 3 November, 24 November, and 8 December 2016. The match kickoff times are 19:00 and 21:05 CEST/CET, except for certain matches in Azerbaijan, Kazakhstan and Russia. The match kickoff times for matchdays 5 and 6 in Turkey, and all simultaneous matches in the same group on matchday 6, were changed to 17:00 CET due to the decision of the Turkish government to use the UTC+3 time zone all year round starting from September 2016.

Times up to 29 October 2016 (matchdays 1–3) are CEST (UTC+2), thereafter (matchdays 4–6) times are CET (UTC+1).

Group A

Group B

Group C

Group D

Group E

Group F

Group G

Group H

Group I

Group J

Group K

Group L

Notes

References

External links
2016–17 UEFA Europa League

2
2016-17